You Don't Love Me Anymore may refer to:

 "You Don't Love Me Anymore" (Eddie Rabbitt song)
 "You Don't Love Me Anymore" ("Weird Al" Yankovic song)